The NZSA Laura Solomon Cuba Press Prize is an award for published and unpublished New Zealand writers. It is named after New Zealand writer Laura Solomon, who died in 2019, and funded by a gift from her family. It was first awarded in 2021.

History 

The NZSA Laura Solomon Cuba Press Prize is an award which celebrates and commemorates the life and work of New Zealand writer Laura Solomon. Laura Solomon was a poet, novelist, playwright and software developer and a long time member of NZSA. When she was 22, her first novel Black Light was published, but her writing career was later cut short by the diagnosis of a brain tumour and she died on 18 February 2019, aged 44.

The Prize is open to published or unpublished authors who have New Zealand citizenship or are permanent residents of New Zealand and covers manuscripts from a wide range of genres including fiction, poetry, drama, creative non fiction and writing for children. The judging criteria, as set by Laura Solomon, call for new writing with a unique and original vision.

The Prize was established and funded from a bequest from Laura Solomon and The Solomon Family. It is judged by a three-person panel consisting of one New Zealand literary figure and representatives from the Solomon family and The Cuba Press. The winner is awarded a cash award of $1000 (as an advance) and a publishing contract with The Cuba Press.

The Prize was first administered in 2020 with the announcement of the inaugural winner being made in 2021.

List of winners by year 

2021: Lizzie Harwood: Polaroid Nights

2022: Rachel Fenton: Between the Flags

Runner-up: Philippa Werry: Iris and Me

See also 

 List of New Zealand literary awards

References

Laura Solomon